Brian Hopkins (born 22 July 1941) is a New Zealand cricketer. He played in three first-class matches for Wellington in 1966/67.

See also
 List of Wellington representative cricketers

References

External links
 

1941 births
Living people
New Zealand cricketers
Wellington cricketers
People from Chippenham